The pale-olive greenbul (Phyllastrephus fulviventris), or pale-olive bulbul, is a species of songbird in the bulbul family, Pycnonotidae.

Distribution and habitat
It is found in western Angola, Gabon, southern Congo and extreme western Democratic Republic of the Congo. Its natural habitats are subtropical or tropical dry forests, subtropical or tropical moist lowland forests, and moist savanna.

References

Phyllastrephus
Greenbuls
Birds of Central Africa
Birds described in 1876
Taxonomy articles created by Polbot